Gordon Polofsky (January 10, 1931 – October 7, 2013) was an American football linebacker and guard. He played for the Chicago Cardinals from 1952 to 1954.

He died on October 7, 2013, in Knoxville, Tennessee at age 82.

References

1931 births
2013 deaths
American football linebackers
American football guards
Tennessee Volunteers football players
Chicago Cardinals players